Niti can refer to:
 Nickel titanium alloy or Nitinol
 Shape memory alloy
 Niti Valley and Niti Pass in the Indian state of Uttarakhand
 NITI, a Bulgarian UAV
 Niti, (Sanskrit: नीति), ethical theories in Hinduism
 NITI Aayog, NITI Aayog (India)